Disclosure is the tenth studio album by the Dutch rock band The Gathering, released via Psychonaut Records on 12 September 2012.

Background
The Gathering have evolved drastically in their 23 years of existence, going from death-doom metal in their early days, through gothic metal to more progressive sounds and settling somehow in a genre popularly labelled as "trip hop".

Reception 

Jonathan Selzer of Metal Hammer stated, "Less low-key, more electronics-infused than 2009's The West Pole, it's still at the mercy of melancholic driftwinds, Silje's rich, ruffled Arctic floe able to bear devastation with haunting, soul-cleansing grace. If you're fond of frill-free, fragile emotional hinterlands that don't dissolve under scrutiny, Disclosure will reach down deep." Sputnikmusic review observes, "From start to finish, Disclosure is an extraordinary endeavor into the farthest reaches of The Gathering's progressive/experimental side. Silge Wergeland plays a major role in Disclosure's success, but it is important not to overstate her responsibility at the expense of the rest of the band. Selecting even just a few tracks at random is enough to understand the quality and depth of their imagination, not to mention their strength of execution."

Track listing

Charts

Personnel 
The Gathering
 Silje Wergeland – vocals
 René Rutten – guitars, theremin, backing vocals
 Hans Rutten – drums, backing vocals
 Frank Boeijen – keyboards, (backing) vocals
 Marjolein Kooijman – bass, backing vocals

Additional musicians
 Jos van den Dungen – violin and viola on track 1, 2, 3, 4, 6 and 7
 Noel Hofman – trumpet on track 2 and 4
 Maaike Peterse – cello on track 1, 3, 6 and 7
 Bjørnar Nilsen – speaking voice on track 7

Production
Bass, Backing Vocals – Marjolein Kooijman
Design [Design & Dtp] – Martijn Busink
Engineer [Additional Drums, All Additional Recordings] – René Rutten
Engineer [Drums] – George Konings
Engineer [Vocals] – Arve Isdal, Herbrand Larsen
Illustration – Carlos Manuel Vergara Rivera
Keyboards, Backing Vocals, Vocals – Frank Boeijen
Lyrics By – F. Boeijen (tracks: 2), S. Wergeland
Mastered By – Paul Matthijs Lombert
Mixed By – Guido Aalbers
Music By – F. Boeijen (tracks: 1 to 7), R. Rutten (tracks: 2 to 4, 7, 8)
Photography By [Band] – Marcus Moonen
Producer – René Rutten

References

External links 
Disclosure on thegathering.bandcamp.com

The Gathering (band) albums
2012 albums